This article includes the 2014 ITF Men's Circuit tournaments which occurred between October and December 2014.

Point distribution

Key

Month

October

November

December

References

External links
International Tennis Federation official website

 10-12